Portnashangan is a civil parish in County Westmeath, Ireland.

Portnashangan is one of 8 civil parishes in the barony of Corkaree in the Province of Leinster.

Portnashangan civil parish comprises 8 townlands: Ballynafid, Ballynagall Clanhugh Demesne, Loughanstown, Mountmurray, Piercefield, Portnashangan and Rathlevanagh. Of these, Mountmurray and Piercefield lie west of Lough Owel, the others to the east of the lake. The two parts of the parish have no land connection and are separated by the area of Leny parish.

The neighbouring civil parishes are: Stonehall and Tyfarnham to the north, Rathconnell (barony of Moyashel and Magheradernon) to the east, Mullingar (Moyashel and Magheradernon) and Portloman to the south and Leny to the east.

References

External links
Portnashangan civil parish at the IreAtlas Townland Data Base
Portnashangan civil parish at Townlands.ie
Portnashangan civil parish at Logainm.ie

Civil parishes of County Westmeath